The Wadi Araba Crossing (Jordanian name) or Yitzhak Rabin Crossing (Israeli name) is an international border crossing between Aqaba, Jordan and Eilat, Israel. Opened on August 8, 1994, it is currently one of three entry/exit points between the two countries that handles tourists.

In February 2006, the Israelis renamed their border terminal to Yitzhak Rabin Terminal, after the slain Prime Minister who had signed the Israel Jordan Peace Treaty in 1994.

The terminal is open from 6:30 to 20:00, Sunday through Thursday, and from 8:00 to 20:00 on Fridays and Saturdays, every day of the year except for the holidays of the Islamic New Year and Yom Kippur.

In 2010, 465,059 people and 8,007 vehicles have crossed the border.

Israeli terminal

Transport to and from the terminal
The terminal can be reached by a 5-minute taxi ride from Eilat. Only privately owned Israeli cars may cross through the terminal and travel within Jordan after a change of license plates, registration and the payment of a tax.

Route 109 runs east from Eilot interchange at Highway 90 to the border crossing.  It is 1.5 km long.

Public buses Route No. 390, 393, 394, 397, 399, 444, 990, 991 and 993 stop at the Junction of Route 90 and Route 109. It is an approximate 20 minutes walk from the bus stop to the terminal.

Jordanian terminal

Aqaba Special Economic Zone Authority
Visitors from most countries receive a special employment/residency visa from the Aqaba Special Economic Zone Authority. The visa is affixed to the passport, generally next to the visa stamp granting the passport holder one month in The Hashemite Kingdom of Jordan. Anyone who wishes to overstay their visa, must register with the Jordanian Police.

Some 85,172 Jordanian workers coming to work in southern Israel crossed into Israel through the Yitzhak Rabin crossing, up from 81,016 in 2006, marking a 5.8 percent increase.

Gallery

References

US Consular Information Sheet - Israel, the West Bank and Gaza

External links
Official
Yitzhak Rabin Border Terminal info
AQABA Special Economic Zone Authority

Israel–Jordan border crossings
Aqaba
Toll bridges
Buildings and structures in Eilat